Cochylimorpha jucundana is a species of moth of the family Tortricidae. It is found in Spain, France, Italy, Switzerland, Slovenia, Bosnia and Herzegovina, Croatia, Hungary, Romania, North Macedonia and Russia.

The wingspan is about 16 mm. Adults have been recorded from wing in June.

References

J
Moths of Europe
Moths described in 1835